Parliamentary elections were held in Armenia on 30 May 1999. There were 75 constituency seats and 56 elected on a national basis using proportional representation. The result was a victory for the Unity Bloc, which won 62 of the 131 seats.

Results

References

Armenia
1999 in Armenia
Parliamentary elections in Armenia
1990s in Armenian politics
Election and referendum articles with incomplete results